Harriet MacGibbon (born Harriet E. McGibbon; October 5, 1905 – February 8, 1987) was an American film, stage and television actress best known for her role as the insufferably snobbish, "blue-blooded Bostonian" Mrs. Margaret Drysdale in the sitcom The Beverly Hillbillies.

Career
MacGibbon joined the stock company of Edward Clarke Lilley at Akron, Ohio. She then went to San Francisco and played leading roles for Henry Duffy. In Louisville, Kentucky, she acted with Wilton Lackaye, Edmund Breese, William Faversham, Tom Wise and Nance O'Neil. There were regular productions, including Ned McCobb's Daughter, The Front Page, The Big Fight, and a "transcontinental tour" starring MacGibbon in The Big Fight, which began in Boston, Massachusetts, took in New Haven, Connecticut and Hartford, Connecticut, and ended at Caine's storehouse. During all of her travels while performing, MacGibbon managed to remain in Boston long enough to study the harp with Alfred Holy, first harpist with the Boston Symphony Orchestra. She later said that when she gave up the instrument, Mr. Holy, "with unconscious humor", remarked, "What a pity, Miss MacGibbon, you look so lovely with a harp." 

She had a long and distinguished career on the Broadway stage, beginning in 1925 at the age of 19 when she acted in the play Beggar on Horseback at the Shubert Theatre. In the late 1930s, she did You Can't Take It With You, the Pulitzer Prize-winning comedy, at the Biltmore Theatre in Los Angeles. From 1934 to 1937, MacGibbon portrayed Lucy Kent on the NBC radio soap opera Home Sweet Home.

Her film debut was a non-speaking bit as a snooty woman walking a dog across a golf course in W.C. Fields' The Golf Specialist (1930), shot in Fort Lee, New Jersey. She made numerous guest appearances on television starting in 1950, including Bewitched, Ray Milland's sitcom Meet Mr. McNutley. Another sitcom in which MacGibbon appeared was My Three Sons, performing as Margaret Cunningham in the 1961 episode "Bub Goes to School". She was cast in five theatrical movies, including Four Horsemen of the Apocalypse (1962), which was directed by Vincente Minnelli and starred Glenn Ford, Ingrid Thulin, Charles Boyer, and Lee J. Cobb. Unlike her stage roles, MacGibbon's movie and television roles usually consisted of snooty society ladies, including her well-known role as Margaret Drysdale on The Beverly Hillbillies.

Personal life and death
MacGibbon was married twice: to William R. Kane (divorced) and later to Charles Corwin White Jr., which ended when White died on December 25, 1967. With her first husband she had one child, a son. MacGibbon died at age 81 due to heart and lung failure. She was cremated, and her ashes interred in niche 61046 in the Columbarium of Remembrance at Forest Lawn Memorial Park (Hollywood Hills), Los Angeles, California.

Filmography

TV filmography
 Wacky Zoo of Morgan City (1970) as Mrs. Westerfield
 The Judge and Jake Wyler (1972) as hostess
 The Best Place to Be (1979)

TV series – regular
 Golden Windows (1954) as Mrs. Brandon (credited as Harriet McGibbon)
 Hazel (1961) as Mother Baxter (uncredited)
 The Beverly Hillbillies (1962–1969) as Mrs. Margaret Drysdale
 The Smothers Brothers Show (1965) as Mrs. Costello

References

External links

 
 
 "History of Homeopathy – Biographies" about MacGibbon's father with some family background
 

1905 births
1987 deaths
American film actresses
American stage actresses
American television actresses
American radio actresses
American Academy of Dramatic Arts alumni
Actresses from Chicago
Burials at Forest Lawn Memorial Park (Hollywood Hills)
Deaths from respiratory failure
20th-century American actresses